Sidbury is a large village in Devon, England.

Sidbury may also refer to:

Places 
 Sidbury, Eastern Cape, a village in the Albany district, Eastern Cape, South Africa
 Sidbury, Shropshire, England, a village and civil parish
 Sidbury Castle, an Iron Age hillfort near Sidbury in Devon, England
Sidbury Hill, site of a hillfort in Wiltshire, England
Sidbury Manor, a privately owned mansion near Sidbury, Devon, England

People with the surname
 James Sidbury, American historian
 Lawrence Sidbury (born 1986), American football player